The Asian Fencing Confederation (AFC) or Fencing Confederation of Asia  (FCA) is an international body created in 1988, charged with the promotion and development of fencing in Asia. It organises the Asian Fencing Championships annually, in all levels: seniors, juniors and cadet, under 23 and veterans.

Colonel Houshmand Almasi, President of the Iranian Fencing Federation, was the first president of the organisation.

See also
Fédération Internationale d'Escrime
Asian Fencing Championships

References

External links
 Asian Fencing Confederation, official site

Fencing organizations
Sports governing bodies in Asia
1988 establishments in Asia
Sports organizations established in 1988